Microsyodon is an extinct genus of non-mammalian therapsids.

See also

 List of therapsids

References

 The main groups of non-mammalian synapsids at Mikko's Phylogeny Archive

Anteosaurs
Prehistoric therapsid genera
Permian animals of Asia
Permian animals of Europe
Fossil taxa described in 1995